This is a list of child actors from France. Films and/or television series they appeared in are mentioned only if they were still a child at the time of filming.

Current child actors (under the age of eighteen) are indicated by boldface.

B 
Christophe Bourseiller (born 1957)
La guerre des boutons / War of the Buttons (1962)
Une Femme Mariée (1964)
Two or Three Things I Know About Her... (1967)

C 
Jean Claudio (1927–1992) 
La tragédie impériale / Rasputin (1938)
Les disparus de St. Agil / Boys' School (1938) 
L'enfer des anges (1941)
Lola Créton (born 1993)
Imago (2004)
Les Enfants de Timpelbach (2008)
Bluebeard (2009)
En Ville (2011)

D 
 René Dary (1905-1974)

Catherine Demongeot (born 1948)
Zazie dans le metro (1960)

F 
Benoît Ferreux (born 1955)
Murmur of the Heart (Le souffle au cœur) (1971)
It Only Happens to Others (Ça n'arrive qu'aux autres) (1971)
Brigitte Fossey (born 1946)
Forbidden Games (Jeux interdits) (1952)

G 
François Goeske (born 1989)
 2001: Der kleine Mann
 2002: Bibi Blocksberg
 2003: The Jungle Book 2 (singing role)
 2003: The Flying Classroom
 2004: Bergkristall
 2004: The Kids Ten Commandment (voice)
 2006: French for Beginners
 2006: The Last Train (voice)
 2006: Breaking and Entering (voice)
Patricia Gozzi (born 1950)
Sundays and Cybele (Les Dimanches De Ville D'Avray) (1962)
Rapture (1965)

H 

André Heuzé (born 1913)
Poil de carotte (1925)

I 
Eva Ionesco (born 1965)
Spermula (1976)
Le Locataire (1976)
Maladolescenza (1977)
L'Amant de poche (1978)
Meurtres à domicile (1981)

J 
Fabrice Josso (born 1969)
Sans famille / An Orphan's Tale (1981)

L 
Pascal Lamorisse (born 1950)
White Mane (1953)
The Red Balloon (Le Ballon Rouge) (1956)
Le Voyage en Ballon (1960)
Jean-Pierre Léaud (born 1944)
Les Quatre Cents Coups / The 400 Blows (1959)
Robert Lynen (1920-1944)
Poil de carotte / The Red Head (1932)
Le Petit Roi (1933) 
Sans famille (1934)

M 
Sophie Marceau (born 1966)
La Boum (1980)

P 
Georges Poujouly (born 1940)
Forbidden Games (Jeux interdits) (1952)
We Are All Murderers (Nous sommes tous des assassins) (1952)
Les Diaboliques (1955)
And God Created Woman (Et dieu...créa la femme) (1956)

S 
Ludivine Sagnier (born 1979)
Le Secret d'Iris (1996)
Vacances au purgatoire (1992) 
La Famille Fontaine (1992) 
Cyrano de Bergerac (1990) 
Le Pont du silence (1990)
Je veux rentrer à la maison (1989)
Les Maris, les Femmes, les Amants (1989)
Jules Sitruk (born 1990)
Monsieur Batignole (2002)
Moi César, 10 ans 1/2, 1m39 / I, Cesar (2003)

T 
Victoire Thivisol (born 1991)
Ponette (1996)
Children of the Century (1999)
Chocolat (2000)

V 
Judith Vittet (born 1984)
The City of Lost Children (La Cité des enfants perdus) (1995) 
Nelly and Mr. Arnaud (1995)

 List
France